This is a list of notable indie rock artists. Individual musicians are listed alphabetically by their last name.

0–9

 The 1975
 1990s
 7th Order
 764-HERO
 The 88

Back to top

A

 A Common Year
 Aberdeen City
 The Academy Is...
 Action Action
 Steve Adey
 Adorable
 The Afghan Whigs
 The Ailerons
 Air Miami
 The Airborne Toxic Event
 Airhead
 Alabama Shakes
 Alcian Blue
 Alex G
 The Alice Rose
 ¡All-Time Quarterback!
 Aloha
 Alterkicks
 Alt-J
 Alvvays
 The Amazing
 Amber Smith
Amber Run
 Ambulance LTD
 The American Analog Set
 American Authors
 American Standards
 Ammonia
 American Football
 Anamanaguchi
 Anathallo
 Amsterdam
 ...And You Will Know Us by the Trail of Dead
 Erika M. Anderson
 Kyle Andrews
 Animal Collective
 Animal Kingdom
 Anni B Sweet
 The Anniversary
 The Antlers
 Apostle of Hustle
 The Apples in Stereo
 The Appleseed Cast
 The Aquarium
 Arab Strap
 Arcade Fire
 Archers of Loaf
 Architecture in Helsinki
 Arctic Monkeys
 Arkells
 Art Brut
 As Cities Burn
 Asian Kung-Fu Generation
 Asobi Seksu
 Athlete
 Atlas Genius
 Au Revoir Simone
 Augie March
 Augustana
 Augustines
 Austin TV
 The Autumn Defense
 The Avalanches
 Avantgarde
 The Avett Brothers
 Avey Tare
 Avi Buffalo
 Awolnation

Back to top

B

Ba–Bm

 Babybird
 Babyshambles
 Baby Strange
 Bad Astronaut
 Bad Books
 Bad Suns
 The Badgeman
 Badly Drawn Boy
 Bailter Space
 Julien Baker
 Balthazar
 Band of Horses
 Band of Skulls
 Baptist Generals
 Baryonyx
 Bastille
 Bat for Lashes
 Battle
 James Bay
 David Bazan
 Be Your Own Pet
 Beach Fossils
 Beach House
 Beady Eye
 The Beat
 Beat Crusaders
 Beat Happening
 Beatnik Turtle
 Beatsteaks
 Beck
 Bedhead
 The Bees
 Beirut
 Bell X1
 Bellini
 Jon Bellion
 Bello Spark
 Belly
 Brendan Benson
 Best Coast
 The Beta Band
 Bethlehem Steel
 Bettie Serveert
 Between the Trees
 Beulah
 Beware of Darkness
 The Bevis Frond
 Biffy Clyro
 Big Black
 Big Flame
 Big Japan
 The Big Moon
 The Big Pink
 The Big Sleep
 Andrew Bird
 Jade Bird
 Birdmonster
 Bishop Allen
 Bitch Magnet
 Biting Elbows
 The Black Angels
 Black Box Recorder
 Black Box Revelation
 Black Camaro
 The Black Heart Procession
 Black Honey
 The Black Keys
 Black Kids
 Black Lips
 Black Rebel Motorcycle Club
 Black Tie Dynasty
 Blackmail
Bleached
 Bleachers
 Blind Pilot
 Bloc Party
 Blouse
 Blonde Redhead
 Blood Red Shoes
 Blue October
 The Bluetones
 Blur

Back to top

Bn–Bz

 The Boggs
 The Bohemes
 Bombay Bicycle Club
 Bon Iver
 Bonaparte
 The Books
 Born Ruffians
 Boss Hog
 Bound Stems
 The Boxer Rebellion
 Boy
 Boy Kill Boy
 Boygenius
 Billy Bragg
 Brainiac
 Brand New
 The Bravery
 The Brian Jonestown Massacre
 Phoebe Bridgers
 Bright Eyes
 The Bright Light Social Hour
 Bristeil
 Brite Futures
 British Sea Power
 Broken Bells
 Broken Social Scene
 Broken Spindles
 Bromheads Jacket
 The Brother Kite
 The Brothers Martin
 Cary Brothers
 Ian Brown
 The Brunettes
 The Buddyrevelles
 Jake Bugg
 Built to Spill
 Butterglory
 Butthole Surfers

Back to top

C

Ca–Cm

 Cable
 Caesars
 Cage the Elephant
 Cajun Dance Party
 Cake
 Calexico
 Calla
 Calpurnia
 Camber
 Camera Obscura
 Los Campesinos!
 Brendan Canning
 Cansei de Ser Sexy
 The Cape May
 The Cape Race
 Capital Cities
 Cap'n Jazz
 The Capricorns
 Carissa's Wierd
 Carter the Unstoppable Sex Machine
 Car Seat Headrest
 Neko Case
 Caspian
 Castor
 Cat Power
 Catatonia (band)
 Catfish and the Bottlemen
 Catherine
 Catherine Wheel
 Cavetown
 The Charlatans
 Charlie Straight
 Chavez
 Chester French
 Chet Faker
 Chikita Violenta
 The Chills
 Chisel
 Circa Survive
 Circa Waves
 Circulatory System
 Citizens Here and Abroad
 Clairo
 Clap Your Hands Say Yeah
 The Clean
 Clearlake
 The Clientele
 Clinic
 Cloud Cult
 Cloud Nothings
 The Cloud Room
 Cold War Kids

Back to top

Cn–Cz

 CocoRosie
 The Coctails
 Cocteau Twins
 Codeine
 Cold War Kids
 Coldplay
 Colony House
 Paul Collins
 Colossal
 Colour Revolt
 The Comas
 Come
 Common Rotation
 Company of Thieves
Conan Gray
 The Connells
 Consafos
 Constantines
 Jack Conte
 Contrived
 Controller.controller
 Controlling the Famous
 Cookie Duster
 Cop Shoot Cop
 Copeland
 The Coral
 The Coral Sea
 Cornershop
 Amy Correia
 Matt Costa
 Courteeners
 Cows
 Graham Coxon
 The Crabs
 The Cranberries
 Cranes
 The Cribs
 Criteria
 Dan Croll 
 Crooked Fingers
 The Crookes
 Crying
 Crystal Antlers
 Crystal Castles
 Crystal Fighters
 Cub
 Cud
 Cuff the Duke
 Cults
 Cursive
 Curve
 Cut Off Your Hands
Cuco
 Cymbals Eat Guitars

Back to top

D

 Lucy Dacus
 The Dandy Warhols
 Daphne Loves Derby
 Dappled Cities
 Dark Stares
 Darker My Love
 Daughter
 Dawn of the Replicants
 Dawnstar
 Days Away
 Deakin
 Dear and the Headlights
 The Dears
 Death Cab for Cutie
 The Decemberists
 Deer Tick
 Declan McKenna
 Deerhunter
 The Defog
 Dehd
 Delays
 Delta Spirit
 Mac Demarco
 Denali
 Department of Eagles
 The Departure
 Desaparecidos
 Destroyer
 The Detachment Kit
 dEUS
 Kevin Devine
 The Diableros
 DIIV
 Dikta 
 The Dinner Is Ruined
 Dinosaur Bones
 Dinosaur Jr.
 Dirty Pretty Things
 Dirty Projectors
 Dishwalla
 The Dismemberment Plan
 Dispatch 
 La Dispute
 The Dodos
 Dogs
 Dogs Die in Hot Cars
 Dolo Tonight
 Dom
 Charles Douglas
 Dover
 Doves
 Dr. Dog
 The Dream Syndicate
 Dressy Bessy
 Drowners
 The Drums
 Dry the River
 Heather Duby
 The Dudes
 Duotang
 Dwarves
 DYGL
 The Dykeenies
 Los Dynamite

Back to top

E

 Eagle Seagull
 Eagulls
 Earlimart
 The Early November
Echo and the Bunnymen
 Echo Orbiter
 Echobelly
 Echosmith
 Edison Glass
 Editors
 The Edsel Auctioneer
 Edward Sharpe and the Magnetic Zeros
 Eels
 Efterklang
 Eggs
 Eisley
 Elastica
 El Azote
 Elbow
 The Elected
 Electrasy
 Electrelane
 Electric President
 The Electric Soft Parade
 Elefant
 Eleventh Dream Day
 Elf Power
 Elle King
 Elliott Brood
 Embrace
 Empire of the Sun
 The Enemy
 Enon
 Erase Errata
 Eric's Trip
 The Essex Green
 Even
 The Evens
 Ever We Fall
 Evermore
 Ewert and The Two Dragons
 Exit Clov
 Explosions in the Sky
 Eyeshine
 EZ Basic

Back to top

F

 The Fall
 The Faint
 Fair to Midland
 Fairmont
 Fake Problems
 Faker
 Fanfarlo
 Far
 Farrah
 The Fashion
 Fastbacks
 Feeble Little Horse
 Feeder
 Felt
 The Feelies
 Fiction Plane
 Fields
 The Fiery Furnaces
 Figurines
 Film School
 Liam Finn
 The Fire Engines
 Fitz and the Tantrums
 Fleet Foxes
 Florence and the Machine
 Flower
 Foals 
 The Folk Implosion
 For Against
 Forgive Durden
 The Format
 Foster the People
 Fotos
 The Frank and Walters
 Frankie Cosmos
 Franz Ferdinand
 The Fratellis
 The Fray
 Freelance Whales
 French Kicks
 The Fresh & Onlys
 Freshlyground
 Friendly Fires
 Frightened Rabbit
 Friska Viljor
 Fuck
 Fugazi
 Funeral Party
 Funk Trek
 Fur
 Further Seems Forever
 Future Islands
 The Futureheads

Back to top

G

 Galaxie
 Galaxie 500
 Galileo Galilei
 The Gamits
 Brian Garth
 The Gaslight Anthem
 Gatsbys American Dream
 General Fiasco
 Generationals
 Geneva
 Geographer
 Geologist
 The Get Up Kids
 Jenn Ghetto
 Ghostwood
 Giant Drag
 Girl in a Coma
 Girl in Red
 Girls
 Girls Against Boys
 Glass Animals
 Glasvegas
 The Go-Betweens
 Go Radio
 The Go! Team
 Godspeed You! Black Emperor
 The Golden Dogs
 The Golden Seals
 Gomez
 The Good Life
 Good Shoes
 Goon Moon
 Gorillaz
 Gossip
 Gotye
 Graffiti6
 Grand Archives
 Grandaddy
 The Grates
 Green Day
 Gregory Gray
A Great Big Pile of Leaves
 Adam Green
 Anthony Green
 Grenadine
 Grifters
 The Griswolds
 Grizzly Bear
 Grouplove
 Guadalcanal Diary
 Guided by Voices
 Noah Gundersen
 Guster
 Jim Guthrie
 Guv'ner

H

 Ha Ha Tonka
 HAIM
 Hair Peace Salon
 Emily Haines
 Half Japanese
 Half Man Half Biscuit
 Half Moon Run
 The Halo Benders
 Ham Sandwich
 Albert Hammond, Jr.
 Handsome Furs
 Happy Mondays
 Hard-Fi
 The Hard Lessons
 PJ Harvey
 Harvey Danger
 Juliana Hatfield
 Haven
 Gemma Hayes
Head and the Heart
 Headlights
 Headphones
 Headswim
 Thee Heavenly Music Association
 Heavens
 Heavy Stereo
 Hefner
 The Helio Sequence
 Helium
 Help She Can't Swim
 Henry's Dress
 Henry's Final Dream
 Her Space Holiday
 Her's
 Los Hermanos
 Hey Rosetta!
 High and Driving
 The High Dials
 Hippo Campus
 The Hiss
 Hoax
 The Hold Steady
 Hollerado
 The Holloways
 The Honorary Title
 The Hoosiers
 Hop Along
 The Horrors
 An Horse
 Hot Chip
 Hot Club de Paris
 Hot Hot Heat
 The Hours
 The House of Love
 The Housemartins
 Howling Bells
 Howlin' Maggie
 Hozier
 Hum
 Human Highway
 The Hundred in the Hands
 Hurricane#1
 The Hush Sound
 HY
 Hymns

Back to top

I

 I Am Arrows
 I Love You but I've Chosen Darkness
 Ida
 Ida Maria
 Idaho
 Idiot Pilot
 Idlewild
 Imagine Dragons
 Immaculate Machine
 Imogen Heap
 In-Flight Safety
 Les Incompétents
 Infadels
 Inspiral Carpets
 Interpol
 Inviolet Row
 Iron & Wine
 Iron On
 Islands
 Ivy

Back to top

J

 Jack's Mannequin
 Jaguar Love
 Jack White
 Jagwar Ma
 Jale
 Jamie T
 Jannabi
 Japandroids
 Jawbox
 Jeff Rosenstock
 Jellyfish
 Jeniferever
 The Jesus and Mary Chain
 The Jesus Lizard
 The Jezabels
 Jet
 Jets to Brazil
 Jimmy Eat World
 JJ72
 Jjamz
 Joan of Arc
 Johnny Foreigner
 Johnossi
 Daniel Johnston
 Jon Spencer Blues Explosion
 Jonezetta
 The Joy Formidable
 Joy Zipper
 Joyce Manor
 Jukebox the Ghost
 Julien-K
 The June Brides
 June of 44
 The Jungle Giants
 Tyler Joseph
Jupiter One

Back to top

K

 Kabul Dreams
 Kaiser Chiefs
 KaitO
 Kakkmaddafakka
 Karate
 Karkwa
 The Karl Hendricks Trio
 Karnivool
 Kasabian
 Kashmir
 Katie Kim
 The KBC
 Keane
 Kent
 Kettcar
 Kids in Glass Houses
 Kids of 88
 Killing Joke
 The Kills
 Kind of Like Spitting
 King Charles
 King Cobb Steelie
 Kings of Convenience
 Kings of Leon
 
 Kiss Kiss
 Kitchens of Distinction
 Klaxons
 Klimt 1918
 The Knux
 Kodaline
 Kongos
 The Kooks
 Kubb
 Ben Kweller

Back to top

L

 Ladyhawk
 Ladyhawke
 Land of Talk
 Mark Lanegan
 Larrikin Love
 The La's
 Last Dinosaurs
 The Last Shadow Puppets
 The Late B.P. Helium
 The Law
 LCD Soundsystem
 Adrianne Lenker
 Sondre Lerche
 Letting Up Despite Great Faults
 Levitation
 Jenny Lewis
 Liars
 The Libertines
 The Like
 Lilys
 Little Birdy
 Little Comets
 Little Joy
 The Little Killers
 Little Man Tate
 The Little Ones
 Local Natives
 Lodger
 London Grammar
 The Lonely Forest
 The Long Blondes
 The Long Winters
 Longview
 Longwave
 Look Mexico
 Look See Proof
 Lord Huron
 Lotus Plaza
 LOUDspeakers
 Louis XIV
 Love as Laughter
 Lovechild
 Lovedrug
 Lovejoy
 LoveLikeFire
 The Lovely Bad Things
 The Lovely Feathers
 The Lovely Sparrows
 Low
 Lowtide
 Low Water
The Lumineers
 Luna
 Lush
 The Luyas
 Lydia
 Lykke Li

Back to top

M

Ma–Mg

 M83
 The Maccabees
 Macha
 Math the Band
 Madsen
 Mae
 The Mae Shi
 MagellanMusic
 The Magic Numbers
 Magneta Lane
 The Magnetic Fields
 Magon (musician)
 Major Maker
 The Make-Up
 Making April
 Malajube
 Male Bonding
 Pyotr Mamonov
 Man Man
 Manchester Orchestra
 Eleni Mandell
 Mando Diao
 Dan Mangan
 Manic Street Preachers
 Aimee Mann
 Mansun
 Maps
 Maps & Atlases
 Marine Research
 Maritime
 The Mark Inside
 Laura Marling
 The Mars Volta
 Mates of State
 Matmos
 Matt and Kim
 Matt Pond PA
 Maxïmo Park
 Mazhar-Fuat-Özkan
 Erin McKeown
 Mclusky
 Andrew McMahon
 Mean Red Spiders
 Meg & Dia
 Memphis
 Javiera Mena
 Meneguar
 Menomena
 The Mercury Program
 Mercury Rev
 Mesh-29
 Metavari
 Metric
 Metronomy
 The Metros
 Meursault
 Mew
 MewithoutYou
 MGMT

Back to top

Mh–Mm

 Ingrid Michaelson
 The Microphones
 Midlake
 Midnight Choir
 Midnight Juggernauts
 The Midway State
 Milburn
 Amy Millan
Milky Chance
 Mineral
 Miniature Tigers
 The Mint
 The Minus 5
 Minus the Bear
 Miou Miou
 The Miracle Workers
 Mirah
 Mission of Burma
 Lisa Mitchell
 Mitski

Back to top

Mn–Mz

 The Moaners
 Modest Mouse
 The Moggs
 Mogwai
 The Moldy Peaches
 Moneen
 The Moog
 Moonbabies
 Thurston Moore
 Moose
 The Mooseheart Faith Stellar Groove Band
 Moped
 Moptop
 The Morning Benders
 Morning Parade
 Morning Runner
 Morningwood
 Morphine
 Morrissey
 Mortimer Nova
 Mor ve Ötesi
 Mother Mother
 Motion City Soundtrack
 Motocade
 Motorama
 Bob Mould
 Mount Eerie
 The Mountain Goats
 Moving Mountains
 Moving Units
 Mr Hudson & the Library
 MS MR
 múm
 Mumford & Sons
 Mumm-Ra
 Murder by Death
 Alexi Murdoch
Muse
 Mutemath
 My American Heart
 My Bloody Valentine
 My Brightest Diamond
 My Dad Is Dead
 My Federation
 My Morning Jacket
 Mya Rose
 The Myriad
 Myslovitz
 Mystery Jets

Back to top

N

 Nada Surf
 Name Taken
 The Naked and Famous
 Natalie Portman's Shaved Head
 The Nation of Ulysses
 The National
 The Neighbourhood
 The Nein
 Neon Horse
 Neon Indian
 Neon Neon
 Neon Trees
 The Nerves
 The Nervous Return
 Neutral Milk Hotel
 Neva Dinova
 The New Electric Sound
 New Order
 The New Pornographers
 The New Year
 New Young Pony Club
 A. C. Newman
 Joanna Newsom
 The Night Marchers
 Nightmare of You
 Nine Black Alps
 No Motiv
 Noah and the Whale
 Noisettes
 A Northern Chorus
 Nothing But Thieves
 The Notwist
 Nova Social
 The Novembers
 Novillero
 Now It's Overhead
 Now, Now
 Nude
 Number Girl
 Number One Cup
 Nunatak

Back to top

O

 Ó
 Oasis
 Oberhofer
 Ocean Colour Scene
 Of Monsters and Men
 of Montreal
 Office
 Ogre You Asshole
 OK Go
 Okkervil River
 The Olivia Tremor Control
 One for the Team
 One Night Only
 OneRepublic
 Tara Jane O'Neil
 Operahouse
 Oranger
 The Others
 Owls
 The Oxfam Glamour Models
 Oxford Collapse

Back to top

P

Pa–Pm

 P:ano
 P.K. 14
 pacificUV
 The Paddingtons
 Page France
 The Pains of Being Pure at Heart
 Pale Saints
 Panda Bear
 Pandemonaeon
 The Paper Hearts
 Paper Lions
 Papercuts
 The Parlotones
 Passion Pit
 The Pastels
 Pato Fu
 Paulson
 Pavement
 Pearl Jam
 Pedro the Lion
 Jack Peñate
 People in Planes
 The Perishers
 Pernice Brothers
 Peter Bjorn and John
 Liz Phair
 Phantogram
 The Phantom Band
 Phantom Planet
 Grant-Lee Phillips
 Phoenix 
 The Phoenix Foundation
 Phofo
 Piano Magic
 Piebald
 The Pigeon Detectives
 The Pillows
 Pilot Speed
 Pinback
 The Pink Spiders
 Pixies
 Placebo
 Los Planetas
 Plastiscines
 Plants and Animals
 Joel Plaskett
 Plastilina Mosh

Back to top

Pn–Pz

 Pele
 Pocket Symphonies
 Poets of the Fall
 Robert Pollard
 Polvo
 The Polyphonic Spree
 Pomplamoose
 Pony Pony Run Run
 Pony Up
 The Ponys
 The Popguns
 Portastatic
 Portugal. The Man
 The Posies
 Robert Post
 The Postal Service
 Powerspace
 Pram
 Pretty Girls Make Graves
 Primal Scream
 The Primitives
 Prolapse
 The Promise Ring
 Protein
 The Protomen
 Prototypes
 Matt Pryor
 Psapp
 Pull Tiger Tail
 Pulp
 Punchline
 Purity Ring
 Pussy Galore
 PVRIS
 Josh Pyke

Back to top

Q

 Quasi

Back to top

R

 R.E.M.
 Ra Ra Riot
 Rachel's
 The Raconteurs
 Rademacher
 Radio 4
 The Radio Dept.
 Radioactive Sago Project
 Radiohead
 Railroad Jerk
 Rainbow Arabia
 Rainer Maria
 Raining Pleasure
 Raised by Swans
 The Rakes
 Lee Ranaldo
 The Rapture
 The Rascals
 Ratatat
 The Raveonettes
 Razorcuts
 Razorlight
 Real Estate
 The Real Tuesday Weld
 Red Animal War
 Red House Painters
 The Red Paintings
 Red Sparowes
 Red Stars Theory
 The Redwalls
 Fionn Regan
 Reigning Sound
 Ike Reilly
 The Reindeer Section
 Relient K
 Corrina Repp
 The Republic Tigers
 The Reputation
 Reverend and The Makers
 Rheostatics
 Damien Rice
 The Ridges
 The Rifles
 Right Away, Great Captain!
 Rilo Kiley
 Ringo Deathstarr
 Ringside
 Rio en Medio
 Sam Roberts
 The Robot Ate Me
 The Rock*A*Teens
 Rocket from the Crypt
 The Rocket Summer
 A Rocket to the Moon
 Rodan
 Rodrigo y Gabriela
 Rogue Wave
 Rollerskate Skinny
 Rooney
 The Rosebuds
 Lukas Rossi
 Royal Blood
 Royal City
 The Royal Concept
 Royal Trux
 The Rumble Strips
 Russian Circles
 The Russian Futurists
 Russian Red

 Röövel Ööbik
Back to top

S

Sa–Sg

 Sad Day for Puppets
 Said the Whale
 Saint Motel
 Sajama Cut
 Sakanaction
 Salem Hill
 Salt
 The Salteens
 Sam Fender 
 Sammy
 San Cisco
 Saosin
 Sarge
 Satellite Stories
 Saucy Monky
 Saves the Day
 Les Savy Fav
 Say Anything
 Say Hi
 Scanners
 Scarling.
 School of Seven Bells
 Scrawl
 The Sea and Cake
 Sea Girls
 Sea Wolf
 The Sea Urchins
 Sebadoh
 Secret Machines
 Seigmen
 Self
 Sally Seltmann
 Seneca Hawk
 The Sequins
 Serena-Maneesh
 The Servants
 Servotron

Back to top

Sh–Sm

 She & Him
 She Wants Revenge
 Shed Seven
 Shellac
 Sherwood
 Davetta Sherwood
 The Shins
 Shiny Toy Guns
 Shipping News
 Shitdisco
 The Shondes
 The Shot Heard 'Round the World
 Shotty
 Shout Out Louds
 Shout Out Out Out Out
 Shrag
 Shudder to Think
 Guy Sigsworth
 Sigur Rós
 Silent Old Mtns
 Silkworm
 Silver Jews
 Silversun Pickups
 Simple Kid
 Chris Singleton
 Six Going On Seven
 The Six Parts Seven
 Sky Larkin
 Skydiggers
 Sleater-Kinney
 Sleeper
 Sleigh Bells
 Slint
 The Slip
 Sloan
 Slowdive
 Small Factory
 Elliott Smith
 The Smiths
 Smog
 Smoosh
 Smudge
 The Smugglers

Back to top

Sn–Sr

 Snail Mail
 The Snake the Cross the Crown
 Snow Patrol
 Snowden
 Soccer Mommy
 Sodagreen
 The Softies
 Soltero
 Someone Still Loves You Boris Yeltsin
 Sonic Youth
 Sons and Daughters
 Soul-Junk
 Sound Team
 The Sounds
 South
 Space
 Spacemen 3
 Spain
 Sparklehorse
 Spearmint
 Spector
 Regina Spektor
 The Spinanes
 The Spinto Band
 Spiritualized
 Splendora
 Spoon

Back to top

Ss–Sz

 St. Lucia
 Standard Fare
 Starfish
 Starflyer 59
 Starfucker
 Starlight Mints
 Stars
 Starsailor
 State Radio
 The Static Jacks
 Steadman
 Steel Pole Bath Tub
 Stef Chura
 Stellastarr
 Stereo Total
 Stereolab
 Stereophonics
 Steriogram
 Marnie Stern
 Joanna Sternberg
 Sufjan Stevens
 The Stills
 The Stone Roses
 The Strumbellas 
 Stornoway
 The Strange Death of Liberal England
 The Strapping Fieldhands
 Straylight Run
 The Strokes
 Stuck in the Sound
 Steve Lacy
 The Submarines
 Subrosa
 Subtle
 The Subways
 Sugar
 Suit of Lights
 Sugarmonkey
 Sunday Jones
 The Sundays
 Sunday's Best
 Sun Kil Moon
 Sunny Day Real Estate
 Sunset Rubdown
 Sunset Sons
 Sunset Valley
 The Sunshine Fix
 The Sunshine Underground
 Super Furry Animals
 Supercar
 Superchunk
 Superdrag
 Supergrass
 Supreme Dicks
 Surf Curse
 Surfer Blood
 Surferosa
 Swervedriver
 Swim Deep
 Swimclub
 Swirlies
 Swiss Lips
 Syrup16g

Back to top

T

Ta–Tm

 Tahiti 80
 Taken by Cars
 Taking Back Sunday
 Talkdemonic
 Tall Ships
 The Tallest Man on Earth
 Tally Hall
 Tame Impala
 Tammany Hall NYC
 Tangiers
 Tapes 'n Tapes
 Tav Falco's Panther Burns
 Maria Taylor
 Ted Leo and the Pharmacists
 Teenage Fanclub
 Tegan and Sara
 Telekinesis
 Telenovela Star
 The Temper Trap
 Tender Trap
 Terminal
 Test Icicles
 Thao & The Get Down Stay Down
 That Dog
 theaudience
 Thee Oh Sees
 The Thermals
 These Are Powers
 These Arms Are Snakes
 They Might Be Giants
 They Shoot Horses, Don't They?
 Thinking Fellers Union Local 282
 This Day and Age
 This Mortal Coil
 This Providence
 This Will Destroy You
 Those Dancing Days
 Thousand Yard Stare
 Three Mile Pilot
 The Thrills
 Thriving Ivory
 Throw Me the Statue
 Throwing Muses
 Thrush Hermit
 Thunderbirds Are Now!
 Thursday
 Tickle Me Pink
 Tiger Trap
 Tigers Jaw
 Tilly and the Wall
 Tim & Jean
 Timber Timbre
 The Ting Tings
 The Tiny
 Tiny Vipers
 Titus Andronicus
 Tops (band)
 The Trousers (band)
 The 1975
 Twin Peaks (band)

Back to top

Tn–Tz

 Toad the Wet Sprocket
 Shugo Tokumaru
 Tokyo Police Club
 Tokyo Rose
 Tomte
 Torres
 Tortoise
 Trans Am
 Travis
 Treepeople
 Trembling Blue Stars
 Trespassers William
 Tsarina
 Tsunami
 Corin Tucker
 Tullycraft
 Turn
 TV on the Radio
 Twenty One Pilots
 The Twilight Sad
 The Twilight Singers
 Twisted Wheel
 Two Door Cinema Club
 Two Hours Traffic
 Twothirtyeight

Back to top

U

 Ugly Casanova
 Uh Huh Her
 Ultra Vivid Scene
 The Unicorns
 Unkle Bob

Back to top

V

 The Vaccines
 Vagabon
 Vampire Weekend
Vance Joy
 Sharon Van Etten
 John Vanderslice
 Chad VanGaalen
 The Vaselines
 Velocity Girl
 The Velvet Teen
 Versus
 The Verve
 The Very Hush Hush
 Veto
 VHS or Beta
 The View
 Kurt Vile
 The Violet Lights
 The Virgins
 Viva Voce
 Vivian Girls
 The Von Bondies
 The Vox Jaguars
 Voxtrot
 Viva Machine
 Vundabar

Back to top

W

 Wallows
 Walk the Moon
 Walk Off the Earth
 The Walkabouts
 The Walkmen
 The War on Drugs
 M. Ward
 Jeremy Warmsley
 Warpaint
 Washed Out
 Patrick Watson
 The Wave Pictures
 Wavves
 We Are Scientists
 We Are Wolves
 We Know, Plato!
 We Were Promised Jetpacks
 The Weakerthans
 The Wedding Present
 Ween
 Weezer
 Wet Confetti
 What Made Milwaukee Famous
 Wheat
 Wheatus
 White Denim
 White Flight
 White Hills
 White Lies
 White Rabbits
 The White Stripes
 The Whitest Boy Alive
 WHY?
 Wilco
 Wild Flag
 Wild Nothing
 Wildlife Control
 Winter Gloves
 WinterKids
 Wintersleep
 Denison Witmer
 Wolf Alice
 Wolf Gang
 Wolf Parade
 Nat & Alex Wolff
 The Wombats
 The Woodentops
 Woods
 The Woodsheep
 Hawksley Workman
 The World Is a Beautiful Place & I Am No Longer Afraid to Die
 The Wrens
 WU LYF
 Wye Oak

Back to top

X

 Xiu Xiu
 The xx
 X Ambassadors

Back to top

Y

 Yeah Yeah Yeahs
 Yellow Ostrich
 Yeti
 Yo La Tengo
 You Me at Six
 You Say Party
 Young the Giant
 Young Knives
 Young Rival
 The Young Veins
 Youngblood Hawke
 Youth Group
 Yuck
 Yukon Blonde
 Yves Klein Blue

Back to top

Z

 Zoé
 Zoro
 Zulu Winter
 The Zutons

Back to top

See also

 List of indie pop artists

References

 
Lists of rock musicians by subgenre